Jean Baldassari (18 December 1925 – 10 December 2018) was a French racing cyclist. He rode in the 1950 Tour de France.

References

1925 births
2018 deaths
French male cyclists
Place of birth missing